El Harrach is a district in the northern Algiers Province, Algeria. It was named after its capital, El Harrach.

Municipalities
The district is further divided into 4 municipalities:
El Harrach
Oued Smar
Bourouba
Bachdjerrah

Notable people

See also
 Massacre of El Ouffia (6 April 1832)

Districts of Algiers Province